"Loop de Loop" is a song written by Teddy Vann and Joe Dong and performed by Johnny Thunder featuring The Bobbettes.  It reached No. 4 on the U.S. pop chart and No. 6 on the U.S. R&B chart in 1963.  It was featured on his 1963 album Loop De Loop.

The song was produced by Teddy Vann, and it was Thunder's only Top 40 hit.

The chorus of the song is taken almost in whole from the popular folk song or children's song, known by many variant names, including "Here we go Loop de Loop."   A version the folk song appeared as early as 1849 in James Orchard Halliwell-Phillipps' Popular Rhymes and Nursery Tales, as "Dancing Looby."

Other charting versions
Frankie Vaughan released a version of the song as a single in 1963 which reached No. 5 on the UK Singles Chart, No. 9 in Ireland, and No. 5 in Norway.

Other versions
French group Les Fantômes released an instrumental version in 1963
French group Martin Circus released a french lyrics single version "Si tu me loupes" in 1976
Donald Lautrec released a single in 1963
Bobby Rydell released a version of the song on his 1963 album All the Hits, Vol. 2.
Frank Alamo released a version of the song on a 1963 EP.
Dalida released a version on her 1963 album Eux.
The Liverbirds released a version of the song as a single in 1966.
Harry Nilsson featuring the Masked Alberts Kids Chorale released a version of the song as the B-side to his 1974 single "Don't Forget Me".  It was featured on his album Pussy Cats.
The Walkmen released a version of the song on their 2006 album "Pussy Cats" Starring the Walkmen.
Brian Auger and the Trinity with Soul Sisters released a version of the song on their 2017 live EP June 3rd 1965.

References

1962 songs
1962 singles
Bobby Rydell songs
Harry Nilsson songs
The Walkmen songs
Dalida songs